"It's So Nice to Be Rich" is a song by Swedish singer Agnetha Fältskog from the soundtrack to the 1983 Swedish movie P & B, starring Stellan Skarsgård, Allan Edwall and Lill Lindfors among others. Since the song was not included on Fältskog's 1985 album Eyes of a Woman, the first time the song appeared on an album was the 1996 compilation album My Love, My Life.

History 
The song was written by actor and comedian Hans Alfredson and jazz musician and pianist Gunnar Svensson. It was produced and arranged by Rutger Gunnarsson, engineered by Lennart Östlund and recorded at Polar Studios in Stockholm, Sweden.

The single 
"It's So Nice to Be Rich" was released as a single in Sweden in December 1983 and it reached number 8 on the Swedish singles chart in February 1984. 
It was the only Agnetha Fältskog single to chart in Sweden in 1984. The next single to be released by Fältskog was the 1985 "I Won't Let You Go". The B-side "P & B" was also featured in the movie.

Alternative version 
The version of "It's So Nice To Be Rich" included on Fältskog's compilation album That's Me in 1998 is a previously unreleased edit in mono, sourced from the movie P & B, as the stereo master tape seems to be lost forever so a vinyl rip of the single was used for the 2005 remaster of Wrap Your Arms Around Me.

Chart positions

References 

1983 singles
Agnetha Fältskog songs
1983 songs
Polar Music singles